The Tagaytay–Nasugbu Highway, alternatively known as Tagaytay–Nasugbu Road and formerly as Tagaytay–Tuy–Nasugbu Port Road, is a , two-to-four lane, secondary highway in the provinces of Cavite and Batangas, Philippines, that connects the city of Tagaytay in Cavite and the municipality of Nasugbu in Batangas.

The entire road forms part of National Route 410 (N410) from Tagaytay to Calaca and National Route 407 (N407) of the Philippine highway network from Calaca to Nasugbu.

Route description

The highway starts at Tagaytay Rotunda, where it intersects with Aguinaldo Highway, Tagaytay–Calamba Road and Tagaytay–Talisay Road in Tagaytay. It then runs to the west, traversing Alfonso, which also shares its border with Laurel along the highway, Calaca, Nasugbu, Tuy, and again in Nasugbu.

The highway's segment from Palico Rotonda to its western terminus in Nasugbu is also known as Palico-Nasugbu Highway or Tuy-Nasugbu Highway, while its segment in Cavite is also known as Aguinaldo Highway. According to the Department of Public Works and Highways, its segment from Tagaytay Rotonda to the eastern end of Mahogany Avenue is part of the Tagaytay–Manila via Silang Road, while its segment from there to Diokno Highway is officially named as Tagaytay-Batangas via Tuy Road; the rest of the highway is officially named as is.

History
The highway originally existed as the Lumbangan–Palico (Nasugbu–Tuy) section of Batangas–Bauan–Nasugbu Road, an old road which linked Nasugbu with Batangas. The section was constructed in the mid-1910s. A new road that connects Tuy to the newly-established city of Tagaytay was later constructed in the 1930s and was made part of the highway. The latter also formed part of Highway 17 that linked Imus with Batangas. The entire stretch of the highway was also referred to as Tagaytay-Tuy-Nasugbu Port Road.

Intersections

References 

Roads in Cavite
Roads in Batangas